Party Girl is a 1995 American comedy-drama film directed by Daisy von Scherler Mayer (in her feature directorial debut), starring Parker Posey, and notable for being the first feature film to premiere on the Internet.

Synopsis
Mary is a free spirit filling her days dancing in clubs and throwing house parties. After being arrested for organizing an underground rave, she calls upon her godmother Judy Lindendorf to bail her out. In order for Mary to repay the loan, Judy employs her as a clerk at the library where she works. Mary reluctantly begins her new job while striking up a romance with Lebanese street vendor and aspiring teacher, Mustafa. Despite initial misgivings about work, Mary is inspired to learn how to use the Dewey Decimal System after smoking a joint. Gradually, she becomes very good at her job, but is later fired after having sex with Mustafa in the library. With no money to pay the accumulating rent, she and her roommate Leo, a club DJ, face eviction from their apartment. In desperation, Mary sells her vintage couture in order to pay the bills.

During one of her parties, Mary takes drugs to forget a fight with Mustafa. The next day, she decides to get her life in order and become a librarian, and her fellow workers discuss a path of graduate study. She invites Judy over to talk, but when they arrive, Mary discovers to her horror that her friends have thrown her a surprise birthday party, complete with a male stripper. Mary tells a skeptical Judy that she has finally found her calling in life, and Mustafa and Leo tell Judy that Mary used her library science skills to help them with their careers. Impressed, Judy gives Mary her job back, and joins the party.

Cast
 Parker Posey as Mary
 Anthony DeSando as Derrick
 Guillermo Díaz as Leo
 Donna Mitchell as Rene
 Liev Schreiber as Nigel
 Omar Townsend as Mustafa
 Sasha von Scherler as Judy Lindendorf
 Becky Mode as Ann
 Simon Verhoeven as Kurt

Production
The film had a budget of $150,000 and was shot in 19 days. Much of the cast and crew were already immersed in the queer downtown club scene long before the film was made. In an interview with The Wall Street Journal, Posey recalls that in the early 1990s she "would go out rollerblading at The Roxy on Sundays and to [the party] Love Machine, where I first saw RuPaul", and that, much like in Party Girl club scenes, Posey "would dance with the queens, and they would just annihilate me on the dance floor with their moves."

According to director Daisy von Scherler Meyer, "the fashion was really invented for the film. [Michael Clancy] created an aesthetic for the character and for the movie and combined that with Parker Posey's own fashion obsession." Posey says that they relied on favors to assemble the outfits: "The wardrobe designer, Michael Clancy, and his assistant Vicky Farrell ... pulled a lot of things from their friends", such as designer Todd Oldham.

Internet debut
Party Girl premiered on the Internet on June 3, 1995, transmitted from Glenn Fleishman's Point of Presence Company (POPCO). Appearing live in the POPCO offices, Posey welcomed Internet viewers and then introduced the film. Fleishman recalled the event:
I helped launch the first official full-length [Internet] movie premiere in 1995 in my offices in Seattle. The film was broadcast to several hundred people worldwide over a CU-SeeMe reflector at Point of Presence Company's offices in downtown and then a few minutes, it was projected at The Egyptian in Seattle's Capitol Hill neighborhood. Parker Posey was in our offices to hit the start button on the broadcast. I was one cog in a larger set of wheels that involved the Seattle International Film Festival, Film.com (now part of RealNetworks), First Look Releasing, and the film's producers, as well as another online development company and a CUSeeMe engineering consultant, Joseph Kahan who also worked at NASA down in Texas. The launch was shown on NBC Nightly News in a five-minute segment at the bottom of the Sunday broadcast that week.

Music
Much of the film takes place in clubs and at parties, and a supporting character is a DJ. There are many scenes directly discussing or playing music appropriate to the mid-1990s club scene, several local performers, and most music is diegetic, being clearly played in the scene.

Soundtrack album
The Party Girl soundtrack was released June 8, 1995 by Relativity Records.
 "Mama Told Me (Not to Come)" – The Wolfgang Press
 "Beautiful" – Tom Tom Club
 "You Don't Love Me (No, No, No)" – Dawn Penn
 "Les Ailes" – Khaled
 "I'll Keep Coming Back" – Chanelle
 "Big Apple Boogaloo" – Brooklyn Funk Essentials
 "Anyone Could Happen to Me" – Nation of Abel
 "Peter Piper" – Run–D.M.C.
 "To Be Loved" – Basscut
 "Never Take Your Place" – Mr. Fingers
 "Music Selector Is the Soul Reflector" – Deee-Lite
 "Party Girl (Turn Me Loose)" – Ultra Naté

Reception
The film opened on June 9, 1995, and grossed $472,370 during its initial theatrical release, and has since become a cult classic. Posey says she often gets approached by librarians who are fans of the film: "Librarians and people who work in bookstores are like 'Oh my God, thank you so much. Party Girl made me want to become a librarian.'" Von Scherler Meyer believes Party Girl resonates with audiences because of the film's authentic depiction of underrepresented communities: "When people say 'Oh, the world [in Party Girl] is so diverse,' it's like 'No. That's the world. You don't represent the world in your stuff. Why is your world so segregated?' I think the world is messed up, and Party Girl is normal." On the review aggregator website Rotten Tomatoes, the film holds an approval rating of 79% based on 34 reviews, with an average rating of 6.3/10.

Cultural influence
The film often is noted for its influence on fashion, particularly in the case of Mary's wardrobe.

Television spin-off

A television series based on the film was produced in 1996, starring Christine Taylor as Mary and Swoosie Kurtz as Judy. Although six episodes were filmed, only four were aired and the show was quickly cancelled.

References

External links
  
 
 

1995 films
1995 comedy-drama films
1995 directorial debut films
1995 independent films
1990s American films
1990s coming-of-age comedy-drama films
1990s English-language films
American coming-of-age comedy-drama films
American independent films
Films adapted into television shows
Films directed by Daisy von Scherler Mayer
Films scored by Anton Sanko
Films set in libraries
Films set in New York City
Films shot in New York City